RiskIQ was a cyber security company that was based in San Francisco, California. It provided cloud-based software as a service (SaaS) for organizations to detect phishing, fraud, malware, and other online security threats.

The company was co-founded in 2009 by Lou Manousos, Chris Kiernan, and David Pon. It received $10 million of Series A funding from Summit Partners in February 2013 and $25 million in series B funding from Battery Ventures in May 2014. RiskIQ was a member of the Cloud Security Alliance (CSA).

RiskIQ monitored advertising networks for malware (malvertising) and spyware and also provided mobile app security services. In May 2018, Standard Bank deployed RiskIQ's software to automate the threat analysis of brand infringement, cybercrime and web-based attacks against its digital presence.

RiskIQ was acquired by Microsoft in July 2021 for more than $500,000,000. The product is now part of Microsoft's security solutions.

References

External links
 

American companies established in 2009
Computer security companies
Companies based in San Francisco
Software companies based in the San Francisco Bay Area
Software companies established in 2009
Microsoft acquisitions
Microsoft subsidiaries
2021 mergers and acquisitions
2009 establishments in California